Lasiosepsis is a genus of flies in the family Sepsidae.

Species
Lasiosepsis melanota (Bigot, 1886)
Lasiosepsis melanota (Duda, 1926)

References

Sepsidae
Diptera of Africa
Brachycera genera
Taxa named by Oswald Duda